Angelia Gabrena Paglicawan Ong (born June 27, 1990) is a Filipino-Chinese model and beauty pageant titleholder who was crowned Miss Philippines Earth 2015. She represented the Philippines at the Miss Earth 2015 pageant and won the title.

Early life and education
Ong is half Filipino and half Chinese. She was born on June 27, 1990, in the Lapuz railway district in Iloilo City where she finished her primary and secondary education. She studied a few years at St. Paul University Iloilo for her early college education taking up Mass Communications. She finished secondary education at Hua Siong College (formerly Iloilo Central Commercial High School or ICCHS). She moved to Manila in 2011 and pursued her college education taking up Marketing Management at the De La Salle–College of Saint Benilde where she finished and graduated in 2016.

Accolades and commendations

Office of the Philippine President
On December 14, 2015, the Office of the President of the Philippines commended Ong through Philippine Secretary of Presidential Communications and Operations Herminio Coloma for winning the Miss Earth 2015 title and giving the Philippines its first back-to-back win.

Senate of the Philippines
On December 14, 2015, the Senate of the Philippines through the Philippine Senate Resolution Number 1681 authored by Senator Manuel Lapid commended Ong for honoring the Philippines in her victory in the Miss Earth 2015 pageant. The Resolution indicated that "Ong made history as she succeeded another Filipina beauty queen, a first in the pageant's 15-year history and the third Filipina to bag the prestigious crown with Jamie Herrell as her predecessor and Karla Henry winning the crown in 2008, making the Philippines the only country with a three-crown record."

House of Representatives of the Philippines
The Lower House of the Philippines Congress, House of Representatives of the Philippines through the House Resolution Number 2561 which was authored by Congressman Leopoldo N. Bataoil commended Ong for her victory in the Miss Earth 2015 pageant. The House Resolution stated that "Ong's achievement brought pride to the Filipino people and will serve as an inspiration to young Filipino women, as well and remind the country of its responsibilities to the environment."

Empowered Men and Women of the Year 2017
In December 2017, Ong was one of the awardees of Philippine Empowered Men and Women of the Year 2017 held at the Teatrino Prominade in San Juan, Metro Manila for her inspiring life story and her will to serve other people and communities.

Pageantry

Prior to Miss Earth
Ong joined the StarStruck V and made it to Top 60. She competed and finished Second Runner-Up at the Miss Manila 2014 pageant and won Best in Long Gown and Press Choice Award.

She competed at the Binibining Pilipinas 2011 pageant, representing Iloilo City, and she received the People's Choice Special Award as the "Face of Binibining Pilipinas 2011."

Miss Philippines Earth 2015
Ong participated and won in the Miss Philippines Earth 2015 on May 31, 2015, at the Mall of Asia Arena in Pasay and earned the right to represent the Philippines at Miss Earth 2015 pageant.

She expressed support for same-sex marriage rights during a question-and-answer portion of 2015 pageant:

She bested 37 other hopefuls from across the Philippines and was crowned by Miss Earth 2014 Jamie Herrell. As Miss Philippines Earth, her advocacy is focused on restoration, reforestation, and minimizing carbon footprint through ecotourism.

Miss Earth 2015
Ong represented the Philippines and won in the Miss Earth 2015 pageant held at Marx Halle, Vienna, Austria. The coronation night occurred on December 5, 2015. During the pre-pageant activities, Angelia won a silver medal for the Miss Friendship award and a bronze medal for the evening gown competition.

During the Top-8 round of question and answer, Angelia was asked what would be Miss Earth's slogan for the next fifteen years. She replied:

During the announcement of winners, Angelia was crowned by her predecessor Jamie Herrell, also from the Philippines. Angelia was the first to win back-to-back for her country in Miss Earth.

During her reign, she has traveled Reunion Island, Vietnam, the United States, Colombia, Sri Lanka, Mauritius, China, Singapore, and numerous trips in the Philippines.

Media and environmental activism
During her early teen years, she was a co-host of the now-defunct GMA Network–Iloilo local Sunday variety show, Bongga from 2004 to 2006.

On December 19, 2015, Ong joined environmental group Ecowaste Coalition and launched the “Iwas-Paputoxic” campaign and urged the people, especially youth, to welcome the 2016 New Year using safe and non-toxic materials.

She hosted the opening ceremony of the Asia–Pacific Forestry Week 2016 aimed at promoting sustainable forest management on February 23, 2016, which was organized by the United Nations Food and Agriculture Organization, Asia–Pacific Forestry Commission, and the Philippine Department of Environment and Natural Resources.

Ong led ten other beauty queens in launching a project of the Armed Forces of the Philippines, dubbed as “Race to One Million Seedlings”, held in Camp Aguinaldo. The project aims to grow and plant one million tree seedlings across Metro Manila, as part of the National Greening Program, which seeks to increase forest cover in Metro Manila and adjacent regions.

Together with Philippine Senator Cynthia Villar, Ong led the Earth Day celebration in the Philippines on April 22, 2016, at the Las Piñas-Parañaque Critical Habitat and Ecotourism Area (LPPCHEA), a wetland situated south of Manila Bay. As an ambassador for environmental protection campaigns in the Philippines, she joined a coastal cleaning effort on the coast of Freedom Island. She also participated with other women in a hand-painting exercise to raise awareness and develop a sense of public responsibility pertaining to environmentally sustainable practices on Earth Day.

Ong completed the Climate Reality Leadership Corps training under US Vice President Al Gore, founder and chairman of the Climate Change Reality Project, for her pursuance of effective platform to create environmental awareness on climate change.

Ong travelled to Reunion Islands and crowned Elsa Techer as Miss Earth Reunion Islands 2016 at the culmination of the gala night on May 7, 2016, in Reunion Islands. During the Philippines Independence Day on June 12, 2016, she talked about her advocacy to fight climate change. On July 28, 2016, Ong went to the United States to attend the coronation of Miss Earth United States 2016 pageant.

She went to Armenia, Colombia, on August 11, 2016, together with Btittany Ann Payne Miss Earth Water 2016, to crown the winner of Miss Earth Colombia 2016. She also joined the Miss Earth Colombia 2016 candidates for the Todos Ponemos program to promote sustainable development, preservation of natural resources, and "the three Rs": reduce, reuse, recycle.

Ong arrived in Sri Lanka on August 26, 2016, with the invitation by TV Derana. There she crowned the winner Derana Miss Sri Lanka for Miss Earth 2016 on August 31, 2016, at Citrus, Waskaduwa. In Sri Lanka, she engaged in numerous environmental projects, including the launching of “Manusath Derana Nature Force’ project, an initiative to plant one million trees in the country where 300 sandalwood plants were initially planted. She was accompanied by Brittany Ann Payne, Miss Earth Water 2016.

In April 2017, Ong and Miss Earth 2016 Katherine Espín flew to Angola for the Earth Day 2017 and for the crowning of Miss Earth Angola 2017 and also graced a tree planting activity together with Fundacao Verde with the support of the Government of Angola and the Ministerio do Ambiente.

She traveled in various countries during her reign as Miss Earth 2015 such as Réunion Island, Vietnam, the United States, Colombia, Sri Lanka, Mauritius, China, Singapore, Czech Republic, Germany and all over the Philippines to raise environmental public awareness.

Ong served as the muse of Thailand delegates in the opening ceremony of the 2019 Southeast Asian Games held at the Philippine Arena in the Philippines on November 30, 2019.

She appeared in the cover page of an American monthly women's fashion magazine Harper's Bazaar- Vietnam edition in November 2020 edition.

References

External links
 

1990 births
Living people
Binibining Pilipinas contestants
De La Salle–College of Saint Benilde alumni
Filipino people of Chinese descent
Miss Earth 2015 contestants
Miss Earth winners
Miss Philippines Earth winners
People from Iloilo City
People from Manila
Star Magic
Visayan people
VJs (media personalities)
Participants in Philippine reality television series
StarStruck (Philippine TV series) participants